Kleverskerke is a small village in the Dutch province of Zeeland. It is located in the municipality of Middelburg, about 4 kilometres north-east of the city centre.

History 
The village was first mentioned in 1251 as Clawarskerke, and means "(private) church of Clawaert (person)". Kleverskerke used to be a free heerlijkheid (=no fief) and a castle was located near the village. Kleverskerke became an independent parish in 1251. The church dates from 1862.

Kleverskerke was home to 194 people in 1840. Kleverskerke was a separate municipality until 1857, when it was merged with Arnemuiden. In 1997, it became part of the municipality of Middelburg.

Gallery

References

Populated places in Zeeland
Former municipalities of Zeeland
Middelburg, Zeeland